Domenico Aliperta (born 10 November 1990) is an Italian professional footballer who plays as a midfielder for Serie D club Cavese.

Club career
On 31 July 2021, he signed with Arezzo.

On 9 December 2021, he joined Serie D club Cavese.

References

External links

1990 births
Living people
Footballers from Naples
Italian footballers
Association football midfielders
Serie C players
Serie D players
Genoa C.F.C. players
S.S.C. Bari players
A.S. Noicattaro Calcio players
S.S.D. Città di Gela players
Cavese 1919 players
U.S. Agropoli 1921 players
A.S.D. Nocerina 1910 players
A.C.R. Messina players
S.S. Arezzo players